Peggy M. Welch is an American nurse and former politician from Indiana. Welch is a former member of Indiana House of Representatives.

Early life 
On October 13, 1955, Welch was born in Fulton, Mississippi. Welch's father was Roger McDaniel, a school principal. Welch is a native of Itawamba County, Mississippi who attended Terry Consolidated School in Terry, Mississippi. Welch graduate of Clinton High School in Clinton, Mississippi.

Career 
Welch began her career as a nurse, and later an educator.

In 1998, Welch became a Democratic member of the Indiana House of Representatives, representing the 60th District, until 2012.
In 2012, as an incumbent, Welch lost the election. Welch was defeated by Peggy Mayfield.

Personal life 
Welch's husband is David. They have one child. Welch and her family live in Bloomington, Indiana.

References

External links
Indiana State Legislature – Representative Peggy Welch Official government website
Follow the Money – Peggy Welch
2008 2006 2004 2002 2000 1998 campaign contributions

 Peggy Welch at ballotpedia.org

Democratic Party members of the Indiana House of Representatives
1955 births
Living people
Politicians from Bloomington, Indiana
Women state legislators in Indiana
People from Fulton, Mississippi
21st-century American women